Julián Ezequiel Reynoso Esparza (born 5 September 1952) is a Mexican politician from the Labor Party. From 2008 to 2009 he served as Deputy of the LX Legislature of the Mexican Congress representing Sinaloa, and previously served in the Congress of Sinaloa.

References

1952 births
Living people
Politicians from Monterrey
Labor Party (Mexico) politicians
21st-century Mexican politicians
Autonomous University of Nuevo León alumni
Members of the Congress of Sinaloa
Deputies of the LX Legislature of Mexico
Members of the Chamber of Deputies (Mexico) for Sinaloa